Arnolfo di Cambio (c. 1240 – 1300/1310) was an Italian architect and sculptor. He designed Florence Cathedral and the sixth city wall around Florence (1284–1333), while his most important surviving work as a sculptor is the tomb of Cardinal de Braye in S. Domenico, Orvieto.

Biography
Arnolfo was born in Colle Val d'Elsa, Tuscany.

He was Nicola Pisano’s chief assistant on the marble Siena Cathedral Pulpit for the Duomo in Siena Cathedral (1265–1268), but he soon began to work independently on an important tomb sculpture. In 1266–1267 he worked in Rome for King Charles I of Anjou, portraying him in the famous statue housed in the Campidoglio. Around 1282 he finished the monument to Cardinal Guillaume de Braye in the church of San Domenico in Orvieto, including an enthroned Madonna (a Maestà) for which he took as a model an ancient Roman statue of the goddess Abundantia; the Madonna's tiara and jewels reproduce antique models. In Rome Arnolfo had seen the Cosmatesque art, and its influence can be seen in the intarsia and polychrome glass decorations in the Basilica of Saint Paul Outside the Walls and the church Santa Cecilia in Trastevere, where he worked in 1285 and 1293 respectively. In this period he also worked on the presepio of Santa Maria Maggiore, on Santa Maria in Aracoeli, on the monument of Pope Boniface VIII (1300) and on the bronze statue of St. Peter in St. Peter's Basilica.

In 1294–1295 he worked in Florence, mainly as an architect. According to his biographer Giorgio Vasari, he was in charge of construction of the cathedral of the city, for which he provided the statues once decorating the lower part of the façade destroyed in 1589. The surviving statues are now in the Museum of the Cathedral. While the design of the Church of Santa Croce has been attributed to Arnolfo, this is highly disputed. Vasari also attributed to him the urban plan of the new city of San Giovanni Valdarno.

The monumental character of Arnolfo's work has left its mark on the appearance of Florence. His funerary monuments became the model for Gothic funerary art.

Giorgio Vasari included a biography of Arnolfo in his Lives of the Most Excellent Painters, Sculptors, and Architects.

Dante Alighieri probably makes a discrete reference to him with a double citation of the Battle at Colle Val d'Elsa, birthplace of the great artist, in the year 1269 in the Cantos XI, XIII of Purgatorio. Dante met nearly certainly Arnolfo, as architect of the cathedral in Florence, at latest when Dante was prior of Florence in 1300.

Selected works

Architecture
Santa Maria del Fiore, Florence Cathedral, 1296.  Arnolfo's design was extended and completed by other architects in the 14th and 15th centuries.
Palazzo Vecchio in Florence, 1299.

Sculpture
St. Peter Enthroned inside St. Peter's Basilica, is often attributed to Arnolfo.
Monument to Pope Adrian V (1276, attributed) – San Francesco, Viterbo
Monument to Riccardo Cardinal Annibaldi (1276) – San Giovanni in Laterano, Rome
Statue of Charles I of Anjou (1277) – Campidoglio, Rome
Fountain of the Thirsty People (Fontana Minore) – Perugia
Tomb of Cardinal Guillaume de Braye (c. 1282) – San Domenico, Orvieto
Monument of Pope Boniface VIII  – the Museo dell'Opera del Duomo – Florence

Footnotes

Sources

External links

Arnolfo di Cambio in the "History of Art"

1240 births
14th-century deaths
People from Colle di Val d'Elsa
Architects of cathedrals
Gothic architects
Gothic sculptors
13th-century people of the Republic of Florence
13th-century Italian architects
13th-century Italian sculptors
Italian male sculptors